Marco Corsi (born Sunderland, England) is an electrical engineer working for Texas Instruments, Inc.

Corsi was named a Fellow of the Institute of Electrical and Electronics Engineers (IEEE) in 2013 for his work in the development of high-speed amplifiers and analog-to-digital converters. Corsi was elected Texas Instruments Senior Fellow in 2014

References 

https://ieeexplore.ieee.org/ielx7/4563670/6532347/06532436.pdf?tp=&arnumber=6532436&isnumber=6532347

Fellow Members of the IEEE
Living people
Year of birth missing (living people)
American electrical engineers